Liscard and Poulton railway station was located in Wallasey, Wirral, Cheshire and was an intermediate station on the Seacombe branch of the Wirral Railway.

History
The station opened to passengers on 1 June 1895, hosting regular passenger services to Wrexham, Chester, West Kirby and New Brighton. The station consisted of an island platform, located deep in a sandstone cutting accessed from a road bridge on Mill Lane, with a booking office at street level. A coal siding with an adjoining sloping approach road were also located at the station.

Passenger numbers were poor, although the line was also regularly used by goods traffic. When the majority of the Wirral Railway was electrified in 1938, the Seacombe branch was omitted.

Closure
The station was closed to passengers on 4 January 1960, although the line did continue to serve goods trains up until 1963. The route was then used to form the approach road to the Kingsway (Wallasey) Tunnel.

References

Further reading

Disused railway stations in the Metropolitan Borough of Wirral
Former Wirral Railway stations
Railway stations in Great Britain opened in 1895
Railway stations in Great Britain closed in 1960
Wallasey